The 75th Independence Anniversary Medal was issued to commemorate the historic occasion of 75 years of the independence of India.

Criteria
The medal was issued by the Government of India through a Presidential Notification for all personnel of Armed Forces, Central Armed Police Forces, Fire Service, Personnel of Central Police Organisations, Railway Protection Force and all state police forces borne on strength on 15 August 2022.

Design
The medal is circular in shape and made of cupro-nickel. It is 35 mm in diameter and will have Lion Capital of Ashoka on the front. The back will have the Ashoka Chakra with the words 75th Anniversary of Independence along with 1947-2022. The ribbon is blue coloured and has the colours of the national flag in the middle. The background will be of 10 mm each on either side of the national flag, which will have each colour with a width of 4 mm.

References

External links

Military awards and decorations of India
Awards established in 2022
2022 establishments in India